The New York State University Police (NYSUP) is the law enforcement agency of the State University of New York (SUNY) system. Approximately 600 uniformed officers and investigators, as well as sixty-four chiefs, serve the 29 state college and university campuses throughout the state.

University Police Officers (UPO) are charged with crime detection and prevention, in addition to the enforcement of state and local laws, rules, and regulations. As part of the unit's prevention activities, officers speak on topics such as sexual assault, drugs, crime prevention and traffic safety. Officers are responsible for developing and maintaining a positive relationship with students, faculty, and staff in order to ensure safety and facilitate cooperation within the campus community.

SUNY Security Force (1968–1998)
During the mid-1960s, unrest on campuses including Demonstrations and protests against the Vietnam War, growing drug use, questioning authority and various political movements and demonstrations prompted the creation of a unified SUNY public safety program. The SUNY Security Force was founded on September 20, 1968. The first civil service exam for the position of Campus Security Officer was given in 1971. The SUNY Security Force was initially part of the Education Law, but was moved to the Penal Law in 1980.

In 1974, the University at Albany security force became the first to be armed.

Several incidents during the 1990s created calls for the security force to be converted into full-fledged police agencies.  These included a hostage-taking in a University at Albany lecture hall by a deranged gunman, the "Bike Path Rapist" who killed a female student at the University at Buffalo and the suspicious circumstances regarding the disappearance of a University at Albany student while on campus. 

On July 22, 1998, the SUNY Police bill was signed by Governor George Pataki. This bill provided for the creation of the New York State University Police. One clause requires each campus president to enter into a "mutual aid" agreement with adjoining police agencies.

NY State University Police (1999–present)
The security forces became the NY State University Police on January 1, 1999.

NYSUP union President James McCartney testified in 2007 before the state Senate Higher Education Committee and, again in 2008, to the SUNY Board of Trustees. His testimony discussed what he claimed to be a dysfunctional, decentralized command system and ongoing staffing, equipment, and training deficiencies. McCartney also expressed concern about the "top-heavy" UPD Chief staff, noting its sixty-five management positions, compared to a combined total of twenty-four across other state law enforcement agencies.

A 2007 investigative audit by the New York State Comptroller found that the majority of SUNY campuses had, in violation of the Federal Clery Act, underreported crimes and failed to disclose required safety and security policies. Following the arrest in 2009 of three SUNY Geneseo students in relation to the death of a nineteen-year-old student, it was revealed that the New York State Inspector General was investigating the incident. Investigators appeared to be focusing the accuracy of crime reporting and on allegations that the police administration was not notifying neighboring agencies of students engaging in off-campus criminal activity. The audit of SUNY compliance with the Clery act was appealed because of complaints that "accounting tricks" were used to find fault with Annual Security Reports (ASR) by the Office of the State Comptroller.  After much discussion and negotiation, OSC issued a formal letter that stated that any discrepancies reported in an earlier audit had been corrected by SUNY, and that campuses were substantially in compliance.

In 2010, the New York State University Police at Stony Brook University became the second in the New York State University Police system to become an accredited law enforcement agency by the New York State Department of Criminal Justice services. The accreditation shows that the department exceeds the standards required to be a law enforcement agency in the state of New York. Fewer than half of the law enforcement agencies in New York meet accreditation requirements.

In December 2015, New York State passed a bill enabling University Police Officers (UPO) to retire after 25 years.  Prior to 2015, the New York State University Police was the only state law enforcement agency requiring employees to work to age 63 to earn pension eligibility.  This had led to instability and a "train and transfer" cycle, where young officers would quickly leave to join law enforcement agencies with more attractive pension plans.

See also
 Campus police
 List of law enforcement agencies in New York
 New York State Police
 City University of New York Public Safety Dept

References

External links
Police for each SUNY school:

University at Albany 
Alfred State College 
Binghamton University 
SUNY Brockport 
University at Buffalo
Buffalo State College
SUNY Canton
SUNY Cobleskill
SUNY Cortland
SUNY Delhi
SUNY Downstate Medical Center
SUNY College of Environmental Science and Forestry
Farmingdale State College
SUNY Fredonia
SUNY Geneseo
SUNY Maritime College
Morrisville State College
SUNY New Paltz
SUNY Old Westbury
SUNY Oneonta
SUNY College of Optometry
SUNY Oswego
SUNY Plattsburgh
Plaza Police
SUNY Potsdam
SUNY Purchase
Stony Brook University
SUNY Polytechnic Institute
SUNY Upstate Medical University

State University of New York
New York, State
State law enforcement agencies of New York (state)
School police departments of New York (state)
1999 establishments in New York (state)
Government agencies established in 1999